Daniel Lee Rose (born 2 July 1990) is an English professional footballer who plays as a left-back. He last played for EFL Championship club Watford. 

Rose started his professional career at Leeds United in 2006, having progressed through the club's youth ranks, but left for Tottenham Hotspur in July 2007 having never played for Leeds. Having failed to break into the first team, he joined Watford on loan in March 2009, making seven appearances, and then joined Peterborough United on loan in September 2009. Having made six appearances for Peterborough, he returned to Tottenham, and made his debut for the latter club. Having still been unable to establish himself as a regular player, he joined Bristol City on loan in September 2010, and made 17 appearances. Although Rose became more involved in the Tottenham team during the 2011–12 season, making 20 appearances in all competitions, he spent the following season on loan to Sunderland, where he made 29 appearances. In January 2020, Rose joined Newcastle United on loan for the rest of the 2019–20 season.

Rose played for England at the under-17 and under-19 levels before making his under-21 debut in 2009. Since then, he established himself in the team, making 29 appearances. He earned his first senior cap in a 3–2 victory against Germany in 2016.

Early and personal life
Rose was born in Doncaster, South Yorkshire. His younger brother Mitch Rose plays for South Shields F.C. He also is the cousin of footballer Michael Rankine, whose uncle Mark Rankine also played professional football.

In June 2018, Rose stated that he had been diagnosed with depression.

On 23 December 2020, Rose was arrested on suspicion of dangerous driving after his car reportedly collided with the central reservation on the A45 in Northampton.

Club career

Leeds United
Rose is a product of the Leeds United youth academy. Rose was named on the bench for the Leeds first team against Barnet in the League Cup on 20 September 2006. The manager who named Rose on the bench, Kevin Blackwell, was dismissed immediately after the match. Rose was not involved again in a squad for Leeds that season. Leeds were subsequently relegated from The Championship to League One, and with the club entering administration, Rose was sold to raise some much needed money for the club.

Tottenham Hotspur

On 25 July 2007, Tottenham Hotspur signed Rose for a transfer fee in the region of £1 million. A regular for both the Academy and Reserves, Rose was named as an unused substitute for the league fixture against Sunderland in January 2008. His progress was temporarily curtailed, however, by a serious knee injury in September of the same year. Rose made his first start for Spurs in 2–2 FA Cup draw against his former club Leeds United in January 2010.

Rose made his league debut against Arsenal, scoring the first goal of the match after ten minutes as Tottenham won 2–1 in the Premier League on 14 April 2010. The goal was subsequently described as "a volley so thunderous that you could hear the whack off his boot above the din of the raucous crowd" in The Times. Rose won Goal of the Season, with votes run by Sky Sports and by the Tottenham website. On 7 May 2011, Rose started against Blackpool to fill in for regular left-back Benoît Assou-Ekotto, although playing out of his usual position, he was specifically praised by manager Harry Redknapp for his performance in the 1–1 draw. Redknapp later explained that he convinced Rose at that time to convert from a left winger to a left-back by arguing that it would be Rose's only way to play for the England national team. Rose would continue to fill in at left-back for the remaining three matches of the season, turning in excellent performances in a narrow loss to Manchester City and wins over Liverpool and Birmingham City.

Loan moves 2009 to 2012
In March 2009, Rose went on loan to Watford for the remainder of the 2008–09 season. Watford manager Brendan Rodgers described Rose as a "highly talented, committed player" who possesses "good energy and real intelligence with the ball." He made his debut in Watford's 2–1 away victory at Doncaster Rovers on 4 April 2009.

On 29 September 2009, Rose joined Peterborough United on loan until January 2010. He then went into that night's team where they played Plymouth Argyle, losing 2–1 at home. Rose returned to Tottenham on 11 November 2009, following the departure of Peterborough manager Darren Ferguson.

On 9 September 2010, Rose joined Championship club Bristol City on a season-long loan deal subject to a recall clause which becomes active after 28 days at the club. On 13 November, Rose came on as a second-half substitute against Leeds United and was booed by the home supporters. The match was the first time he had played at Elland Road after leaving the club. Rose returned to Tottenham Hotspur in February 2011 after a series of minor injuries had limited his impact and appearances at Bristol City.

On 31 August 2012, Rose joined Premier League club Sunderland on a season-long loan from Spurs. Rose played his debut against Liverpool on 15 September 2012. Rose scored his first goal for Sunderland in an away match at Aston Villa on 29 April 2013. Rose returned to Tottenham after being named the club's young player of the season to undergo surgery on a wrist injury in May 2013.

2013–14 season

On 22 August 2013 at the beginning of the season, Tottenham went away to Dinamo Tbilisi in Georgia where Rose scored in the play-off first leg which ended in a 5–0 win. Tottenham qualified for the group stage of the Europa League and in September, their first home match against Tromsø Rose suffered an injury. Rose didn't return to training till mid-December.

Rose missed the match where Tottenham suffered a 5–0 home defeat to Liverpool which subsequently saw André Villas-Boas dismissed as manager. On 22 December with Villas-Boas gone, Rose returned to first-team football under Tim Sherwood where Tottenham went away to Southampton and won 3–2.

Towards the end of the season after six away matches without a win Rose scored the only goal of the match with a header in the 33rd minute against Stoke City to earn Tottenham three points. On 31 July 2014, Rose signed a five-year contract with Tottenham. In the 2014 summer transfer window Tottenham signed Ben Davies which would be competition in the left-back role as well as providing cover if Rose got injured.

2014–15 season
On 1 January 2015, Rose scored his first goal of the season in Tottenham's 5–3 Premier League victory over Chelsea at White Hart Lane. Rose scored again for Tottenham in the FA Cup third-round replay against Burnley at home, netting the final goal in a 4–2 victory. He added to his tally in the Premier League on 22 February against West Ham United, scoring Spurs' first in a 2–2 draw. He started as Tottenham lost 2–0 to Chelsea in the 2015 League Cup Final at Wembley Stadium on 1 March. On 16 May, Rose scored his final goal of the campaign in a 2–0 home victory over Hull City, which effectively left the Tigers needing a win at home against Manchester United to survive relegation which they failed to do.

2015–2018
Rose was named as captain by manager Mauricio Pochettino for the first time in his career in a 2015–16 FA Cup match against Leicester City on 10 January 2016.

On 28 February 2016, Rose scored the winning goal in a 2–1 home victory over Swansea City as Tottenham closed the gap on league leaders Leicester City. This was also his first goal of the season.

On 22 September 2016, Rose signed a new contract with Tottenham Hotspur until 2021. He scored his first goal of the season on 27 August to earn Tottenham a point in a 1–1 draw against Liverpool. He continued to perform strongly for Spurs, putting many important performances in during the first half of the season and on 18 December, he scored the winning goal in a 2–1 win against Burnley after completing a one-two with summer signing Moussa Sissoko. On 31 January 2017, Spurs went away to Sunderland in the Premier League where during the match Rose suffered knee ligament damage. In March the Evening Standard reported that Rose was expected to return in the beginning of April. Although still out injured, Rose was named as left-back in the PFA Team of the Year on 20 April 2017 for the second consecutive season. In May 2017, Tottenham announced that Rose "has undergone exploratory surgery on his left knee" and will not return until next season.

In October 2017, Rose returned to first team training after being out injured for over 9 months. He made his first appearance of the 2017–18 season as a substitute in the UEFA Champions League away game against Real Madrid that ended in a 1–1 draw. He made his first start of the season in a 1–0 home win against Crystal Palace in early November.

2019–2021
In April 2019, he said he was looking forward to ending his football career due to racism in 5 or 6 years. Later that month he said he hoped governing bodies would take more action to eradicate racism in football. In June he started in the Champions League Final against Liverpool, which Tottenham lost.

Rose was not included in the Tottenham squad for the 2019 International Champions Cup. The club stated that "Danny Rose has been granted additional time off in order to explore prospective opportunities with other clubs." However, no move materialised for Rose, and on 10 August 2019 he started in Tottenham's first game of the season, a 3–1 victory against Aston Villa.

On 30 January 2020, Rose moved clubs for the first time in seven years when he joined Newcastle United on loan for the rest of the season. Following his move, Rose criticised Tottenham manager José Mourinho as he felt he was not "given as much of a chance as everybody else in the backline" in the Tottenham squad. The loan was later extended to cover the rest of the season following football's suspension due to the COVID-19 pandemic.

Rose was not allocated a squad number for the season and was omitted from Tottenham's Premier League and Europa League squads, rendering him ineligible for selection by the club in either competition until at least January 2021. On 27 May, Tottenham announced the departures of Rose and Paulo Gazzaniga following the conclusion of their contracts.

Watford
On 16 June 2021, Watford announced the free transfer of Rose who signed a two-year contract.

On 12 July 2022, Rose was in the starting lineup for Tottenham Hotspur U21 in a friendly match against Enfield Town. He had previously asked to appear for Tottenham "one last time" and was granted his wish despite being under contract with Watford for another year. He wore his well-known number 3 shirt. The match ended 3–2 to Enfield.

It was also reported that he was desperate to leave Vicarage Road following Watford's relegation to the EFL Championship. On 1 September 2022, Watford and Rose agreed a mutual cancellation of his contract.

International career

England U21s
On 1 June 2009, Rose was called into the England under-21 team for the European Championships taking place later in the month when striker Danny Welbeck was ruled out through injury. He made his debut with a substitute appearance in a 7–0 friendly win over Azerbaijan on 8 June.

Rose scored his first goal for England U-21s on 14 November 2009 in a 2011 European Championship qualifier win against Portugal. His second goal came in a 2–0 victory against Uzbekistan on 10 August 2010. His third goal for the team came on 5 June 2011 in a 2–0 win against Norway, the final warm-up match before the 2011 UEFA European Under-21 Championship.

On 16 October 2012, Rose was shown a red card during a 2013 UEFA European Under-21 Championship qualification play-off match against Serbia, after he kicked a football into the crowd after the match had finished. Rose had been racially abused by members of the crowd throughout the match and after the match whilst celebrating the victory with his England teammates, which sparked a mass brawl between players and coaching staff of both teams.

Great Britain Olympic football team
On 2 July 2012, Rose was named in Stuart Pearce's final 18-man Great Britain Olympic football squad for the 2012 Summer Olympics.

England senior team

On 28 August 2014, Rose was named in the senior England squad for the first time, ahead of a friendly against Norway and a Euro 2016 qualifier against Switzerland in September, but did not feature. Rose made his debut as a starter in a 3–2 away win over Germany in a friendly on 26 March 2016.

Rose was previously eligible to play for Jamaica through his Jamaican grandfather, and was contacted by the Jamaica Football Federation (JFF) in early 2015 over the possibility of representing Jamaica at international level.

He was named in the 23-man England national team squad for the 2018 FIFA World Cup.

Career statistics

Club

International

Honours
Tottenham Hotspur
Football League Cup runner-up: 2014–15
UEFA Champions League runner-up: 2018–19

England U17 
UEFA European Under-17 Championship runner-up: 2007

England U21
UEFA European Under-21 Championship runner-up: 2009

England
UEFA Nations League third place: 2018–19

Individual
Sunderland Young Player of the Season: 2012–13
PFA Team of the Year: 2015–16 Premier League, 2016–17 Premier League

References

External links

Profile at the Football Association website

1990 births
Living people
Footballers from Doncaster
English footballers
England youth international footballers
England under-21 international footballers
England international footballers
Association football defenders
Leeds United F.C. players
Tottenham Hotspur F.C. players
Watford F.C. players
Peterborough United F.C. players
Bristol City F.C. players
Sunderland A.F.C. players
Newcastle United F.C. players
English Football League players
Premier League players
UEFA Euro 2016 players
2018 FIFA World Cup players
Olympic footballers of Great Britain
Footballers at the 2012 Summer Olympics
Black British sportsmen
English people of Jamaican descent